Charles Hodges (born 1947) is an American organist and songwriter.

Charles Hodges may also refer to:
Charles D. Hodges (1810–1884), U.S. Representative from Illinois
Charles E. Hodges (1892–1968), Democratic President of the West Virginia Senate (USA)
Charles Howard Hodges (1764–1831), British painter
Chas Hodges (1943–2018), English singer

See also
Charles Hodge (1797–1878), Calvinist
Charlie Hodge (disambiguation)